Crazy Mouse is the first Chinese-developed video game to be developed and released for Xbox Live Arcade on the Xbox 360. The game was released on October 15, 2008.

Gameplay

The game has 32 levels in which the player guides a mouse through a vibrantly-colored maze, attempting to grab and eat food, run, dodge and score, depending on the level.

There are two single player modes:

Story: sequential puzzles where the player earns a score and rank on each puzzle
Battle: player competes against a number of mice to see who can score the most points in the shortest amount of time

Multiplayer
The game supports up to both co-op and competitive four player multiplayer, locally or over Xbox Live.

References

External links
Press release

Puzzle video games
2008 video games
Multiplayer online games
Xbox 360 Live Arcade games
Xbox 360-only games
Xbox 360 games
Video games about mice and rats
Video games developed in China